Vilassar de Dalt is a village in Catalonia, Spain, in the province of Barcelona and the comarca of Maresme. The name comes from the Roman name Villa Azari, later changed to Vilassar. In the 20th century, it split into two villages:  Vilassar in the hills (de Dalt), and Vilassar by the Sea (de Mar).

Demography

See also
Cau del Cargol Private Shell Museum with over 16.000 different species.

References

 Panareda Clopés, Josep Maria; Rios Calvet, Jaume; Rabella Vives, Josep Maria (1989). Guia de Catalunya, Barcelona: Caixa de Catalunya.  (Spanish).  (Catalan).

External links

Official website 
 Government data pages 
Historic and artistic heritage

Municipalities in Maresme